Here Come the Rattling Trees is the tenth studio album by Anglo-Irish avant-pop band the High Llamas, released on 22 January 2016. It is an adaptation of a 2014 theatrical play that the group premiered at the Tristan Bates Theatre in London's Covent Garden. The play originally featured a cast of actors and actresses, but the album only features instrumental and vocal performances.

Track listing

References

External links

2016 albums
The High Llamas albums
Drag City (record label) albums